Mostafa Chamran Save'ei (2 October 1932 – 21 June 1981) was an Iranian physicist, politician, commander and guerrilla fighter who served as the first defense minister of post-revolutionary Iran and a member of parliament as well as the commander of paramilitary volunteers in Iran–Iraq War, known as "Irregular Warfare Headquarters". He was killed during the Iran–Iraq War. In Iran, he is known as a martyr and a symbol of an ideological and revolutionary Muslim who left academic careers and prestigious positions as a scientist and professor in the US, University of California, Berkeley and migrated in order to help the Islamic movements in Palestine, Lebanon, Egypt as a chief revolutionary guerilla, as well as in the Islamic revolution of Iran. He helped to found the Amal Movement in southern Lebanon.

Early life and education
Chamran was born into a religious family on 2 October 1932 in Tehran. He received religious education from Ayatollah Taleqani and Morteza Motahari. He studied at Alborz High School and then graduated from Tehran University with a bachelor's degree in electro mechanics.

In the late 1950s, he moved to the United States for higher education, obtaining a M.S. degree from the Texas A&M University. He then went on to obtain his PhD in electrical engineering and plasma physics in 1963 from the University of California, Berkeley.

In the book Self-construction and development he said he was hired as research staff scientist at Bell Laboratories and NASA's Jet Propulsion Laboratory in the 1960s.

Career and activities
Chamran was one of the senior members of the Freedom Movement led by Mehdi Bazargan in the 1960s. He was part of the radical external wing together with Ebrahim Yazdi, Sadegh Ghotbzadeh and Ali Shariati.

Following graduation, Chamran went to Cuba to receive military training. In December 1963, he along with Ghotbzadeh and Yazdi left the US for Egypt where he was trained in guerilla warfare. They met the Egyptian authorities to establish an anti-Shah organization in the country, which was later called SAMA, special organization for unity and action. Chamran was chosen as its military head. Upon his return to the US in 1965 he founded a group, Red Shiism, in San Jose with the aim of training militants. His brother, Mehdi, was also part of the group. In 1968, he founded another group, the Muslim Students' Association of America (MSA), and it was led by Ebrahim Yazdi. The group managed to establish branches in the United Kingdom and France.

In 1971 Chamran left the US for Lebanon and joined the camps of the Palestine Liberation Organization and the Amal movement. He became a leading and founding member of the Islamic revolutionary movement in the Middle East, organizing and training guerrillas and revolutionary forces in Algeria, Egypt, Syria. During the civil war in Lebanon he actively cooperated with Musa Al Sadr, founder of the Amal movement. Chamran also became an Amal member and "right-hand man of Sadr".

Chamran along with Sadegh Ghotbzadeh was part of the faction, called "Syrian mafia", in the court of Khomeini, and there was a feud between his group and the Libya-friendly group, led by Mohammad Montazeri.

With the Islamic Revolution taking place in Iran, Chamran returned to Iran. In 1979, he served as deputy prime minister in the cabinet of Mehdi Bazargan. He led the military operations in Kurdistan where Kurds rebelled against the Interim Government of Iran. He served as minister of defense from September 1979 to 1980, being the first civil defense minister of the Islamic Republic.

In March 1980, he was elected to the Majlis of Iran (the Iranian Parliament) as a representative of Tehran. In May 1980, he was named the Ayatollah's representative to the Supreme Council of National Defense.

Personal life
Chamran was married to Tamsen Heiman, an American Muslim, in 1961. They had one daughter Roushan and three sons Ali, Jamal and Rahim. Jamal drowned during childhood and the rest of them live in the US. After migrating to Lebanon, due to the difficulties they were facing, Tamsen left Chamran in 1973 and went back to the US. She died in 2009.

Later on Chamran was married to a woman from Lebanon, Ghadeh Jaber.

Death

Chamran led an infantry unit during the Iran–Iraq War and received two wounds in his left leg by shrapnel from a mortar shell. However, he refused to leave his unit. He was killed in Dehlavieh on 21 June 1981 as the war was raging on. His death was regarded as "suspicious" and the related details have remained unclear. Chamran was buried in the Behesht-e Zahra cemetery in Tehran.

Legacy
Ayatullah Khomeini publicly proclaimed Chamran as a "proud commander of Islam." Chamran was posthumously given a hero status, and many buildings and streets in Iran and Lebanon were named for him, as well as a major expressway. In 2012, Mohsen Alavi Pour published Chamran's biography. A species of moth was named after him in 2013. Nick Robinson published an English biography of Chamran in the United Kingdom in 2013, 22: Not a new lifestyle for those who thirst for humanity!.

In 2014 a film named Che (Persian: چ) was released to honor Chamran. Directed by Ebrahim Hatamikia, the film portrays two days of Chamran's life after the Islamic Revolution defending Paveh and received much attention and won some awards.

See also

1979 Kurdish rebellion in Iran
Asghar Vesali
List of unsolved murders

References

External links
  

20th-century Iranian engineers
20th-century Iranian politicians
1932 births
1981 deaths
Alborz High School alumni
Amal Movement politicians
Burials at Behesht-e Zahra
Defence ministers of Iran
Deputies of Tehran, Rey, Shemiranat and Eslamshahr
Iranian Irregular Warfare Headquarters guerrillas
Freedom Movement of Iran MPs
Iranian military personnel killed in the Iran–Iraq War
Iranian revolutionaries
Members of the 1st Islamic Consultative Assembly
Military personnel killed by friendly fire
Military personnel killed in action
National Front (Iran) student activists
People of the Iranian Revolution
Texas A&M University alumni
UC Berkeley College of Engineering alumni
University of Tehran alumni
Unsolved murders in Iran